Yan Zi and Zheng Jie were the defending champions, but did not participate.

Émilie Loit and Nicole Pratt won the title, defeating Jill Craybas and Jelena Kostanić in the final.

Seeds

Draw

Draw

Qualifying

Seeds

Qualifiers
  Anne Kremer /  Evgenia Linetskaya

Lucky losers
  Mariana Díaz Oliva /  Aleksandra Wozniak

Draw

Draw

References
Draw

2006 Moorilla Hobart International